Shimon Ratner, also known as Shimon Leumi, and by the nickname "Lumek" was a Polish-born football player and coach, who coached the Mandatory Palestine national football team in 1934, taking control of them for their first ever match during the 1934 FIFA World Cup qualification campaign.

Biography
Ratner was born in Kraków, Poland, to a Jewish family. He emigrated to Vienna in 1914, where he joined Hakoah Vienna. In 1920 Ratner emigrated to Mandatory Palestine, where he joined Maccabi Tel Aviv, later also acting as the club's manager. In 1928 Ratner moved to Maccabi Avshalom Petah Tikva, and later to Hapoel Petah Tikva, where he stayed, in several functions, including as club manager, until 1954. In 1934, Ratner was appointed as manager of the Mandatory Palestine national football team for its campaign	in the 1934 FIFA World Cup qualification. After the campaign, which lasted two matches, Ratner stepped down.
Ratner, who hebraized his last name to Leumi, died on 21 January 1964.

References

1898 births
1964 deaths
Polish footballers
Polish football managers
Polish emigrants to Mandatory Palestine
Footballers from Kraków
Austro-Hungarian Jews
Jewish footballers
Jewish Polish sportspeople
SC Hakoah Wien footballers
Maccabi Tel Aviv F.C. players
Maccabi Petah Tikva F.C. players
Maccabi Tel Aviv F.C. managers
Maccabi Petah Tikva F.C. managers
Hapoel Petah Tikva F.C. managers
Israel national football team managers
Association footballers not categorized by position